Nantwich Rural District was a division of Cheshire until 1974, when it merged with the Nantwich and Crewe urban districts to create the Borough of Crewe and Nantwich, which was itself abolished in 2009.

Former districts of Cheshire